Cordell is an unincorporated community in Lawrence County, Kentucky, in the United States.

History
A post office was established at Cordell in 1898, and remained in operation until it was discontinued in 1975. The community was named in honor of the Cordell family of settlers.

Notable people
Country singer Ricky Skaggs was born in Cordell.

References

Unincorporated communities in Lawrence County, Kentucky
Unincorporated communities in Kentucky